Scott Pilgrim is a series of graphic novels by Canadian author and comic book artist Bryan Lee O'Malley. The series is about Scott Pilgrim, a slacker and part-time musician who lives in Toronto, Ontario, and plays bass ‍in a band. He falls in love with American delivery girl Ramona Flowers, but must defeat her seven evil exes in order to date her in peace.

The original edition of the series consists of six digest size black-and-white volumes, released between August 2004 and July 2010, by Portland-based independent comic book publisher Oni Press. It was later republished by Fourth Estate, an imprint of HarperCollins. Full-colour hardback volumes, coloured by Nathan Fairbairn, were released from August 2012 to April 2014.

A film adaptation of the series titled Scott Pilgrim vs. the World starring actor Michael Cera in the title role was released in August 2010. A video game adaptation developed by Ubisoft for PlayStation Network and Xbox Live Arcade was released the same month.

Development

Creator Bryan Lee O'Malley was inspired to create the series and eponymous character of Scott Pilgrim after listening to Canadian band Plumtree's 1998 single "Scott Pilgrim", a song then-Plumtree singer Carla Gillis describes as "positive, but...also bitter sweet." In particular, O'Malley was inspired by the lyric, "I’ve liked you for a thousand years."

O'Malley wanted to write a shōnen-style comic book series, although he had only read one such series at the time, Ranma ½; in the early 2000s, Japanese manga had not yet achieved significant popularity in North America. O'Malley gained inspiration from the book Even a Monkey Can Draw Manga by Koji Aihara and Kentaro Takekuma. In 2002, O'Malley's roommate, who worked in a comic book store, brought the book to him while O'Malley was working on Lost at Sea and was planning Scott Pilgrim. Upon reading the book O'Malley realized that, despite the satirical tone, it could be an effective guide to how the Japanese comic book industry worked. O'Malley said that Ranma ½ was the strongest influence and Atsuko Nakajima, the character designer of the Ranma ½ anime and other anime, was an influence to a lesser extent. He added that the "exploded page layouts" of Koudelka, a work by Yuji Iwahara, directly influenced the "full-bleed layouts" of Scott Pilgrim. O'Malley said that Osamu Tezuka began influencing his work as he created Volumes 3 and 4. He said, "You can see his influence start to creep in here and there but he's a larger inspirational figure to me than just his drawing style." In regards to the FLCL anime, O'Malley said that while it was an influence, it was "not as much of a direct influence on Scott Pilgrim as people seem to think."

O'Malley used black and white because it was less expensive than creating the series in color, and so O'Malley said that he "embraced the B&W manga aesthetic". When writing the series, O'Malley's first step was developing the direction of the story by creating notes in notebooks, sketchbooks, and computer text files. His second step was to create an outline. His third step was to write a script. His fourth step was to develop thumbnails. His final step was to develop the finished comic book page. To ink, O'Malley usually used brushes, including No. 2 and No. 3 brushes. He mostly used computers to build the screentone; he stated that he encountered difficulty finding screentone in North America. O'Malley himself created most of the Scott Pilgrim material. When production on Volume 6 had begun, O'Malley had hired two assistants. The backgrounds in Volume 6 are more detailed than backgrounds in the previous volumes (O'Malley said that "[m]ost fans don't seem to notice the change").

O'Malley stated that he wanted to create a "hybrid" work that received inspiration from American and Japanese comics, and that he "wanted to reach towards the japanese comics from my own starting point." When asked if he considers Scott Pilgrim to be a manga, O'Malley responded by saying "Um… No, I think I was just thinking about that today. I guess I was just thinking about the whole OEL thing. I think it's influenced… I like the term 'manga-influenced comics,' but I only like it because no one else likes it."

O'Malley said that he expected Scott Pilgrim to sell around 1,000 copies. He did not expect the series to sell millions of copies and to produce a film adaptation. O'Malley cited the United States comics industry and how it differs from the Japanese comics industry; the United States comic book companies specialize in superhero comics and many newer concepts originate from underground comics. The United States also lacks weekly and monthly comic book magazines and American comic companies generally do not have the system of story editors and assistants that Japanese comic companies have.

O'Malley said that the most difficult portion of Scott Pilgrim to write was the ending. O'Malley deliberately did not consider constructing the ending until he began writing Volume 5. He intended for Volumes 5 and 6 to reflect one single story, with 5 being the "darkest hour" and 6 being "the redemption arc." O'Malley said "there was a lot of stuff to juggle, a lot of plot lines to tie up, and I just had to try and focus on the stuff that mattered most in the time I had." In addition, he wanted to create an ending that would "compete[...] a little" with the ending of the film version; he was aware of "how BIG the finale was". About the ending, O'Malley said, "I think the stuff with the girls and the relationships works pretty well and the stuff with Gideon and the glow is weaker. But hey, some people love it warts and all, and it's not like I'm gonna go back and change it."

To illustrate his reasoning for eventually ending the Scott Pilgrim series, O'Malley used a quote from famed Belgian comics writer and artist Hergé, creator, writer, and illustrator of the well-regarded The Adventures of Tintin comic book series, from 1929 until his death in 1983. Hergé told his wife, "And right now, my work makes me sick. Tintin is no longer me. And I must make a terrible effort to invent (him)… If Tintin continues to live, it is through a sort of artificial respiration that I must constantly keep up and which is exhausting me." O'Malley said, "If I was still doing Scott Pilgrim in ten years, I would be dead inside." O'Malley said that he did conceive of a continuation centering on Scott and Ramona and involving the other major characters, except for Gideon and the other evil exes of Ramona. He said, "maybe in a few years I'd think about playing with Scott Pilgrim some more" and although "there doesn't need to be more Scott Pilgrim", he agreed that "more would be fun".

The cover of the third Japanese Scott Pilgrim volume, which includes content from the original volumes 5 and 6, was based on an illustration from Street Fighter Alpha 2 (Street Fighter Zero 2).

O'Malley used the font Swiss 721 Bold Condensed, which was also used in the film. In later books, the regular weight and italic versions of this font were also used. M04 FATAL FURY is the pixel font used in Book 4 and beyond.

Plot

Scott Pilgrim's Precious Little Life (Volume 1)
Scott Pilgrim is a 23-year-old Canadian slacker living in Toronto with his sarcastic gay roommate Wallace Wells. He has started "dating" a Chinese-Canadian high-school girl, Knives Chau. Although his friends think it's scandalous, since she is only 17, Scott doesn't consider it a big deal as all they do is chat about her school-life. It is implied during a phone conversation with his sister, Stacey, that this relationship is Scott's attempt to get over an ex. He is the bass player in the band Sex Bob-omb, along with his friends Stephen Stills (guitar), Kim Pine (drums) and "Young" Neil Nordegraf (who lives in the house they rehearse in), but Stephen is the only member who is recognized as being "the talent" and the other members rarely take the endeavor seriously.

One night, Scott dreams about a girl on rollerblades that he's never met before whom he later glimpses in real life, delivering a package to the library. Her repeated presence in his dreams and a coincidental meeting at a party thrown by Stephen's on-off girlfriend Julie Powers prompts him to become obsessed with finding out more about her. He discovers that she is Ramona Flowers, a girl who works for Amazon.ca and has recently come to Toronto from New York after a rumored messy break-up with someone named Gideon.

Scott orders a few CDs from Amazon.ca as a pretext to meet her again, and receives an email from a person named Matthew Patel, challenging him to battle, but Scott pays it little heed and promptly deletes it. After another dream about Ramona, in which she is carrying his package, Scott wakes to find her at his door. She explains that she uses subspace portals as part of her job to cross long distances in seconds; one such route passes through Scott's brain, hence his dreams. Having convinced her he isn't a weirdo after their previous encounters, they spend the evening together and go back to her house during a heavy snowstorm. After blundering into her bedroom while she is changing, Scott and Ramona kiss and sleep together, but don't have sex.

The next day, Scott goes home. Wallace informs him that he needs to break up with Knives if he plans to pursue a serious relationship with Ramona, but when he meets her later in preparation for their gig at Club Rockit, Knives is considerably more forward than usual, and Scott fails to tell her. He also receives a letter from Matthew, which he again discards.

After an opening performance by rival band Crash and the Boys, Sex Bob-omb prepares to begin their set when Matthew descends upon the stage and engages Scott in a video game-style duel. He introduces himself as Ramona's first evil ex-boyfriend, and has mystical powers that allow him to summon "demon hipster chicks". Scott prevails, his final attack obliterating Matthew and leaving behind a handful of coins. On the subway home, Scott and Ramona decide to become a couple, on the proviso that Scott agrees to defeat her other evil-exes. When Scott asks if Gideon is one of them, Ramona's head glows and she starts acting distant.

Scott Pilgrim vs. the World (Volume 2)
Part 2 opens with a flashback to Scott's high school days, during which he meets and dates Kim, before his family moves to Toronto.

In the present, Wallace issues Scott an ultimatum, telling him he must break up with Knives or he'll tell Ramona about her. Scott goes to meet Knives and awkwardly breaks it off right after she tells him she loves him, but is cheered by thoughts of Ramona. Later, Wallace fills Scott in on Ramona's second evil-ex: movie actor Lucas Lee. While watching one of his movies with Ramona, her head glows again, but it quickly subsides and the two embrace and kiss before going to sleep. Later, she introduces Scott to her pet cat, whom she also named Gideon. Scott goes to meet Lucas at his filming location, the Casa Loma. Lucas immediately beats Scott up, after which they take a lunch break and Lucas tells Scott about the League of Evil-Exes who have organized themselves to come after Scott. Initially, Lucas offers to let Scott go if the latter would give him all his money. Scott counter-offers, daring Lucas to grind the handrail on the stairway down from Casa Loma. Lucas, though reluctant, accepts the challenge, but dies.

Knives, shaken from the breakup, spies on Ramona having dinner with Scott, Kim, Steven and Neil. She goes home and gives herself a total makeover in an effort to get Scott's attention and win him back from Ramona. She finds her chance to attack Ramona at the reference library.

Scott gets a phone call inviting Sex Bob-omb to open for The Clash at Demonhead, a band fronted by one of Scott's ex-girlfriends, Envy Adams. On the night of the gig, it is revealed that Knives is now dating Young Neil, Stephen's roommate, to Stephen's horror. As The Clash at Demonhead plays, Ramona reveals to Scott that the bassist, Todd Ingram, is her third evil-ex.

Scott Pilgrim and the Infinite Sadness (Volume 3)
After the show, Sex Bob-omb meet up with the Clash at Demonhead backstage. Scott tries to punch out Todd right then-and-there, but is stopped by Todd's telekinetic powers, which he and Envy owe to his being vegan.

Flashbacks throughout the story show Scott dating Envy (then Natalie) during their college years, while Todd using his then-new vegan powers to impress Ramona, and later Envy.

Envy proposes a challenge for Scott and Todd: a fight to the death at Honest Ed's—whoever reaches the end of the store first wins. Scott and Todd dash through the store, the contents of which are reminiscent of a haunted house, and Todd is mentally tormented by his past until he goes berserk and causes Honest Ed's to implode. Neither Scott nor Todd win the challenge, but plan to fight again the following night. In the interim, Todd cheats on Envy with the band's drummer Lynette, and on his vegan diet with gelato (which contains milk and eggs).

At Lee's Palace, while Sex Bob-omb perform, Ramona and Envy get into an argument and begin to fight, Ramona armed with a giant mallet. Envy gains the upper hand, but before she could deliver the final flow, Ramona is saved by Knives. Envy catches Todd and Lynette leaving the bathroom together—Lynette's panties on Todd's head. Lynette disappears before Envy can swing Ramona's mallet at her, leaving behind Lynette's robotic arm. Todd tries to get back in Envy's good graces, only to receive a swift knee to his crotch. Enraged, Todd uses his psychic powers to fling Envy to the front of the sound stage, then shamelessly flips off the shocked audience.

Todd and Scott then proceed to have a Bass Battle, and Scott is aided by the powers of Crash and the Boys. Todd almost wins the battle until the vegan police show up and strip him of his powers for multiple vegan offenses, such as eating the gelato earlier. Scott headbutts the powerless Todd, who is reduced to a pile of coins. Afterwards, Scott receives an extra life. Finally, Sex Bob-omb gets to play, while the audience comments on their performance (some consider them amateurish compared to the now-defunct Clash at Demonhead). As they play, the audience gives mostly positive critiques, except for an indifferent man with a shadowy profile wearing glasses who merely says "No comment" and walks away. Scott notices the man briefly as he leaves.

Scott Pilgrim Gets It Together (Volume 4)
Scott and Wallace's landlord remind them that their rent is due soon, prompting Scott to find a job to earn his share. He eventually gets a job as prep cook at Steven's workplace, a vegan restaurant called the Happy Avocado. Scott reunites with Lisa Miller, a friend from high school, but Ramona is skeptic as to whether or not they were truly an item. Seeing Ramona's lack of confidence causes Scott's head to glow. He goes to walk it off, but collapses, looking up to see an evil version of himself, before running off again.

All the while, Scott is hounded by two people: one of them, Roxanne Richter, is Ramona's fourth evil-ex; the other is Knives's father. Both have swords, while Scott is defenseless. Scott pits Roxy and Mr. Chau in battle against each other, but Ramona tells him that was a terrible move. Scott finally tells Ramona he loves her and will do anything to keep their relationship going. On this act of courage, Scott earns a sword of his own, the "Power of Love", which he uses to defeat Roxy. Mr. Chau watches in silence, then goes home to tell Knives that dating a "white boy" wouldn't be so bad.

Scott Pilgrim vs. the Universe (Volume 5)
At a Day of the Dead party, Ramona spots her next two evil ex-boyfriends, Japanese twins Kyle & Ken Katayanagi, who were invited to the party by Julie. Scott approaches them and prepares to fight, but instead is forced to fight their robot, Robot-01. Whilst Scott is fighting the robot, Knives talks to Stephen, who reveals that he and Julie have broken up again; he then tells Knives that Scott cheated on Knives with Ramona, which shocks Knives. Scott then defeats Robot-01 and "wins the party." Scott endures battles with other robots throughout the story.

Scott moves in with Ramona, but still keeps tabs with Wallace, who helps him with information about Gideon—Ramona's last evil-ex. Scott and Ramona's relationship grows distant, between Ramona admitting to Scott that she doesn't like his band, and Knives revealing to Ramona that Scott cheated on her. When Scott confirms this, Ramona calls him "another evil-ex waiting to happen".

Scott and Kim finally ask Ramona why her head glows, but Ramona claims she knows nothing about it. Later at a party, Kim takes a picture of Ramona's glowing head and shows it to her, but refuses to explain. After a nightcap with Scott and Ramona, Kim goes home on the subway, but is kidnapped by the twins. Scott receives a text form Kim in the morning, and goes to rescue her. Waiting for him are the twins, who battle him at once. Scott tries to call this out as 'cheating', but twins reveal 'cheating' is what Ramona did to them, by dating both of them at the same time. It is with Kim's help that Scott defeats the twins. Scott comes home to find that Ramona has cut and dyed her hair, the glow around her head growing brighter and brighter until she disappears altogether, leaving behind a letter addressed to Gideon. Scott, heartbroken, accidentally locks himself out of Ramona's house and Gideon the cat runs away.

Some time later, Scott moves into a new apartment paid for by his parents. Kim moves up north. With Gideon the last evil-ex to battle, Scott grows paranoid, mistaking anyone with glasses to be Gideon—even his own brother. Scott reads Ramona's letter to Gideon, and receives a threatening phone call from Gideon shortly after.

Scott Pilgrim's Finest Hour (Volume 6)
Scared to face Gideon, Scott spends most of his time alone in his apartment, playing video games. When he is finally convinced to go outside, he tries to reconnect with Knives, and later Envy: Knives, who has turned 18 and is college-bound, offers to simply kiss him, but they both find it to be horrible. Envy tries to convince Scott that Gideon, who has produced her solo album, isn't all that bad. Gideon appears in the distance, exchanging intimidating stares with Scott, but it is Scott who chickens out and runs away.

Wallace forces Scott to leave town for a "wilderness sabbatical" in hopes of getting Scott to clear his head and train for his battle with Gideon. Scott is reluctant but eventually heads north and stays with Kim and her parents. In the woods, Kim reveals to Scott that their high school days were not as exciting and life-threatening as Scott remembers them as. Scott's head begins to glow and he once again spots his evil twin, Nega-Scott. A fight ensues between the two, during which Kim tells him that Nega-Scott is a representation of his mistakes, and will not go away until he accepts them. The words hit Scott hard as he suddenly remembers Ramona, and realizes he has been repressing his love for her to escape reality. Nega-Scott stops its assault and merges back into him as Scott finally acknowledges his mistakes, commenting he doesn't deserve Ramona back. Kim gives him encouragement tells him to fight and earn her back. She gives him one last kiss before Scott returns to Toronto.

Scott arrives at Gideon's venue, the Chaos Theatre, for the final confrontation. Gideon is surprised that Ramona is not present, as he planned the night's events around her. Gideon stuns Scott with a punch, pulls out Scott's "Power of Love" sword and impales him with it, killing him. In limbo, Scott reunites with Ramona and they reconcile, Ramona apologizing for leaving him. Scott uses his extra life from Part 3 to bring himself back to life, bringing Ramona with him.

In the ensuing battle that take place both inside and outside of Ramona's head, Gideon reveals he started the League through a drunken rant on Craigslist after Ramona dumped him, invented the glow as a way to contain one's emotions, and used subspace to embellish Scott's duller memories and remove others; his ultimate goal being to marry Ramona and his ex-girlfriends together. Scott sees Gideon objectifying Envy, prompting him to realize how badly his relationships with Knives, Kim and Envy ended, thus winning a new sword—the "Power of Understanding". With Ramona wielding the "Power of Love" sword, they deliver the final blow to Gideon. Gideon bursts into $7,777,777 worth of coins which rain down on the crowd. Envy hugs Scott, bringing their relationship to a proper close, and Gideon's ex-girlfriends are released from their capsules.

Afterwards, Scott and Ramona meet up with the others, who mention the club getting shut down after that night. Ramona reveals that, after leaving Scott, she too went up north for a "wilderness sabbatical", but was not as successful as Scott's. Leaving the club, Scott and Ramona reaffirm their relationship and agree to give it another shot. The next night after work, Scott finds out that Stephen is gay and is currently dating Joseph. Scott and Kim try to start a new band called Shatter Band. The next day, Scott sees Knives off to college. Finally, Scott meets up with Ramona, who is waiting for him at a subspace door, ready to begin their relationship anew. With that, they hold hands and disappear into subspace together.

Publications  
The main graphic novel series is:

Other appearances:
 Comics Festival (40-page anthology including a one-page Scott Pilgrim comic; released on Free Comic Book Day 2005)
 PENG (72-page one-shot comic book by Corey Lewis where Scott Pilgrim appears in one panel; released in 2005)
 Free Scott Pilgrim No. 1 FCBD 2006 Edition (32-page comic book featuring a 17-page original Scott Pilgrim story; released on Free Comic Book Day 2006) This story is available for free online at the Scott Pilgrim Website
 Comics Festival 2007! (40-page anthology including a half-page Scott Pilgrim comic and a 4-page Wonderful World of Kim Pine comic; released on Free Comic Book Day 2007)
 Scott Pilgrim: Full Colour Odds & Ends 2008 (collects Free Scott Pilgrim #1 – newly coloured by Dean Trippe, Wonderful World of Kim Pine four-page story, Now Magazine Best of Toronto two-page strip in black-and-white, the Comics Fest 07 sushi strip, and various watercolours, pin-ups, and advertisements)

All of these ancillary stories are available to read on the Scott Pilgrim Website. A collector's box containing all six volumes and a fold-in poster was released in North America on November 3, 2010.

Scott Pilgrim's Precious Little Life was re-released in color in August 2012, with the others being released on an irregular schedule, the last in May 2015. The hardcover color editions contain bonus content such as original sketches and creator notes.

The entire series was re-released in color again in July 2019 as the Scott Pilgrim Color Collection, collected into 3 larger-format paperback volumes. These three books were released individually and as a box set.

Critical reception  
Publishers Weekly ranked the third volume, Scott Pilgrim & The Infinite Sadness, as one of the best comic books of 2006 in a critics' poll.

Scott Pilgrim was ranked 85th on Wizard magazine's 2008 list of the "200 Greatest Comic Characters of All Time".

In 2007, O'Malley was interviewed by The A.V. Club for the fourth volume. Written by Jason Heller, the article states that Gets It Together is "his best to date." The article goes on to praise O'Malley's consistent bold stylistic choices, saying that he "has raised the bar, art-wise: His deceptively basic style is suddenly deeper, richer, and more mature, while his eye for dynamics and graphic economy has gotten even keener."
In 2011 Scott Pilgrim was ranked 69th in IGN's list of the top 100 comic book heroes.

Japanese comics author Kentaro Takekuma said in an interview that the structure and style of Scott Pilgrim initially did not match the structure and style of Japanese comics, but when he read the battle scenes "it feels very much like a Japanese manga, especially in how you structured the panels. It develops into a very strange, neither American nor Japanese atmosphere." Comics author Koji Aihara added that "I did feel the inspiration from Japanese manga, but it did not strike me as a ripoff of manga style, but a very unique way of expression, I found it a very interesting work. I appreciated you using your own style of expression. Also, I thought your use of solid blacks was very skilled and attractive."

Awards
In 2005, O'Malley won the Doug Wright Award for Best Emerging Talent for the first volume of Scott Pilgrim and was nominated for three Harvey Awards (Best New Talent, Best Cartoonist and Best Graphic Album of Original Work).

In 2006, O'Malley was awarded Outstanding Canadian Comic Book Cartoonist (Writer/Artist) in the Joe Shuster Awards. He was previously nominated in the same category in 2005.

O'Malley was nominated for a 2006 Eisner Award in the category Best Writer/Artist—Humor, for Scott Pilgrim Vs. The World, but lost to Kyle Baker. O'Malley and Scott Pilgrim were also nominated for two 2006 Eagle Awards, and nominated for a second Wright Award (for Scott Pilgrim Vs. The World).

In 2007, O'Malley won the Harvey Award. The series was also awarded a spot in Entertainment Weekly's 2007 A-List.

In 2010, O'Malley won his first Eisner Award in the "Best Humor Publication" category for Scott Pilgrim Vs. The Universe.

In other media

Film

The film Scott Pilgrim vs. the World was released on August 13, 2010. It is based on all six volumes of the graphic novel series with the final book being released after original filming wrapped; this led to a new ending being filmed to match the books before the film's release. The film is directed by Edgar Wright and stars Michael Cera and Mary Elizabeth Winstead as Scott and Ramona, respectively.

The film was a critical success, but did not fare well commercially in cinemas. However, its commercial fortunes improved after being released on Blu-ray and DVD. The DVD includes extras including bloopers, outtakes, deleted scenes, storyboards (which include the ending provided by the comics), and trailers. The 2-disc edition includes soundtracks, animation (when Scott dates Kim), and a making-of.

Scott Pilgrim vs. The Animation
At the 2010 San Diego Comic-Con, Alison Pill (who plays Kim Pine in the movie), revealed that her character's past relationship with Scott will be explored in other media. "There will be a little something-something that will air on Adult Swim," she said.
Creator Bryan Lee O'Malley elaborated by stating "It's gonna be like a series of short animations (to promote the movie).  One of them will be the Volume 2 high school stuff with Kim and Lisa Miller.  I don't know how long it will be but the rough they showed me was like 5 minutes.  The stars of the movie will do the voices for the cartoons." Michael Cera and Alison Pill reprise their roles of Scott Pilgrim and Kim Pine from the movie, whilst Mae Whitman and Jason Schwartzman, who play Roxanne Richter and Gideon Graves in the movie, provide voices for Lisa Miller and Simon Lee respectively. The animated short, entitled Scott Pilgrim vs. the Animation, was produced by Titmouse Inc. and aired on Adult Swim on August 12, 2010, later being released on their website.
The short is based on the flashback from the second graphic novel, elaborating on Scott's adventures in high school. The animation features the songs "Post Acid" and "Beach Demon" by Wavves, though it is replaced with the film's soundtrack in the version included on the DVD/Blu-ray release of the film.

Video game

A video game based on the series, also titled Scott Pilgrim vs. The World, was announced during San Diego Comic-Con 2009 and was developed by Ubisoft Montreal, released alongside the film. The game is a four-player side-scroller influenced by 8-bit and 16-bit video games, with players able to play as Scott Pilgrim, Ramona Flowers, Kim Pine and Stephen Stills (Knives Chau and Wallace Wells were added later as downloadable characters; in the base game, they are respectively an assist character and a shopkeeper). After the player completes the game with Scott, Ramona, Stephen Stills, and Kim, they unlock NegaScott. Mr. Chau (Knives Chau's father), is also an unlockable assist character. The game features music by chiptune punk band Anamanaguchi and art direction by Paul Robertson.

The game was released on PlayStation Network on August 10, 2010 and Xbox Live Arcade on August 25, 2010.

On December 30, 2014, Scott Pilgrim vs. the World: The Game was delisted from the Xbox Live Arcade and PlayStation Network. This follows the earlier delistings of the video games Uno and Marvel vs. Capcom Origins. The game was delisted due to the licenses running out. On September 10, 2020, Ubisoft announced that the game would finally be re-released in honor of its 10th anniversary titled  Scott Pilgrim vs. the World: The Game - Complete Edition. The game was released on PlayStation 4, Xbox One, Nintendo Switch, PC, and  Stadia, on January 14, 2021, with all downloadable content packaged into the game.

Mobile comic
A mobile adaptation of the comic book was produced by HarperCollins and Robot Comics. The app uses movement, sound and vibration to create an original reading experience and includes extra material hidden in the scenes of the comic. It was available for iPhone, iPod Touch, iPad and Android.

Television series
An anime series based on the comics was announced to be in development by Universal Content Productions for Netflix on January 7, 2022 with O'Malley writing and executive producing alongside BenDavid Grabinski, Japanese studio Science Saru providing the animation, Eunyoung Choi serving as producer, and Abel Góngora as director. Edgar Wright, Nira Park, Marc Platt, Jared LeBoff, Adam Seigel, and Michael Bacall will also receive executive producer credits for the series.

References

External links

 Bryan Lee O'Malley's website
 ScottPilgrim.com
 Scott Pilgrim on Ning
 Scott Pilgrim vs. The World The Game at Ubisoft
 

2004 comics debuts
Scott Pilgrim
Pilgrim, Scott
Scott Pilgrim
Scott Pilgrim
Scott Pilgrim
Scott Pilgrim
Comics characters introduced in 2004
Comics set in Canada
Comics set in Ontario
Scott Pilgrim
Pilgrim, Scott
Pilgrim, Scott
Pilgrim, Scott
Scott Pilgrim
Scott Pilgrim
Pilgrim, Scott
Scott Pilgrim
Scott Pilgrim
Scott Pilgrim
 
Scott Pilgrim